Lloyd Emerson Jones (4 January 1906 – 4 July 1990) was an Australian rules footballer who played with St Kilda in the Victorian Football League (VFL).

Notes

External links 

1906 births
1990 deaths
Australian rules footballers from Victoria (Australia)
St Kilda Football Club players
Stawell Football Club players